Borislav Ivaylov Stankov (born 5 May 2002), commonly known as Slavy, is a professional footballer who plays as a forward for Real Valladolid Promesas.

Club career
Born in Huesca, Aragon, Slavy joined Real Valladolid's youth setup in 2019, after representing Valencia CF, SD Huesca, Real Zaragoza and CD Juventud de Huesca. He made his senior debut with the reserves on 12 January 2020, coming on as a second-half substitute for Carlos Doncel in a 2–2 Segunda División B away draw against CD Izarra.

On 29 February 2020, Slavy renewed his contract until 2023, but suffered a serious knee injury in June which kept him sidelined for eight months. On 12 April 2021, he further extended his link until 2024.

Slavy scored his first senior goal on 18 September 2021, netting the B's first goal in a 2–2 home draw against UD San Sebastián de los Reyes in the Primera División RFEF. He made his first team debut on 8 October, replacing fellow youth graduate Toni Villa in a 1–1 Segunda División home draw against Málaga CF.

International career
Born in Spain, Slavy is of Bulgarian descent. He is a youth international for Spain, having represented the Spain U18s. In February 2022, it was reported that Slavy would switch allegiance to Bulgaria. On 15 March 2022 he received his first call-up for Bulgaria U21 for the UEFA Euro 2023 qualification matches against Netherlands and Wales on 25 and 29 March 2022.

References

External links
 
 
 
 

2002 births
Living people
People from Huesca
Sportspeople from the Province of Huesca
Spanish footballers
Spain youth international footballers
Spanish people of Bulgarian descent
Footballers from Aragon
Association football forwards
Segunda División players
Primera Federación players
Segunda División B players
Segunda Federación players
Real Valladolid Promesas players
Real Valladolid players